Christine is a 1958 French period drama film, based on the 1894 play Liebelei (Flirtation) by Arthur Schnitzler. The film was directed by Pierre Gaspard-Huit and the title character was played by Romy Schneider. The cast included Alain Delon as a young lieutenant.

Schnitzler's play had been filmed in 1933 by Max Ophüls as Liebelei, starring Romy Schneider's mother, Magda Schneider.

Synopsis 
In 1906 Vienna, a young lieutenant Franz (Alain Delon) has an affair with a married baroness, Lena. He decides to put an end to it when he meets Christine (Romy Schneider, Delon's fiancée in real life), a musician's daughter.

Christine is almost engaged to a composer, Binder, but falls in love with Franz. Franz breaks it off with Lena, but her husband the Baron Eggesdorf has already discovered the affair.

While Christine and Franz plan their wedding, the Baron challenges Franz to a duel. Franz is killed, and Christine commits suicide.

Cast

Production
Charles Spaak was reported as working on the screenplay.

At the time of filming, Schneider was one of the most popular stars in Europe, having enjoyed success starring in the Sissi film trilogy. Christine was an attempt to duplicate this, being aimed more at the French market.

Delon had only just begun his career when he was cast. He and Schneider began a romantic affair that continued on and off for a number of years.

Reception
The film was the seventeenth most popular film at the French box office in 1958. Before it was The Ten Commandments, Les Misérables, The Cranes Are Flying, Sissi – Fateful Years of an Empress, Young Sinners, Mon Oncle, The Young Lions, Girl and the River, The Possessors, The Law Is the Law, The Vikings, In Case of Adversity, Maigret Sets a Trap, The Cat, and The Mirror Has Two Faces.

References

External links
 Christine (1958) at filmsdefrance.com
 

1958 films
Films based on works by Arthur Schnitzler
Italian drama films
1950s French-language films
1958 romantic drama films
Films directed by Pierre Gaspard-Huit
Films scored by Georges Auric
Remakes of German films
Films set in 1906
French films based on plays
1950s Italian films